The O'Malley Baronetcy, of Rosehill in the County of Mayo, was a title in the Baronetage of the United Kingdom.  It was created on 2 July 1804 for Samuel O'Malley.  The title became extinct on the death of the second Baronet in 1892.

The first baron was son of Owen O'Malley and Anne Mc Gough, daughter of Samuel Mc Gough, esquire of Newry.

O'Malley baronets, of Rosehill (1804)
Sir Samuel O'Malley, 1st Baronet (1779–1864)
Sir William O'Malley, 2nd Baronet (1816–1892)

References

Extinct baronetcies in the Baronetage of the United Kingdom
People from County Mayo